Fear of Falling may refer to:

 Fear of falling, a natural fear typical of most humans and mammals

Film and TV
"Fear of Falling", an episode of All Grown Up!
Fear of Falling, working title of A Master Builder, a 2014 film by Jonathan Demme

Music
 "Fear of Falling" (The Badlees song), from 1995 album River Songs
"Fear of Falling", a song and EP by Paul Johnson (singer)
"Fear of Falling", a song by Cutting Crew from their debut album Broadcast
"Fear of Falling", a song by Uriah Heep from Sea of Light
"Fear of Falling", the B-side of "Apply Some Pressure" by Maxïmo Park
"Fear of Falling", a song by Shona Laing from New On Earth album

Other
 Fear of Falling: The Inner Life of the Middle Class, a book by Barbara Ehrenreich
 "Fear of Falling", a story by Neil Gaiman collected in The Sandman: Fables & Reflections

See also
 Basophobia (disambiguation)